is a 2010 film by Yoji Yamada. The first screening of this film outside Japan was at the closing ceremony of the 60th Berlin Film Festival in 2010.

Plot

The story unfolds as the young Koharu (Yū Aoi), the daughter of a pharmacist in a modest neighborhood of Tokyo, is about to marry the son of a prestigious family, and even before the event everybody is anxious that Tetsuro (Tsurube Shofukutei), the younger brother of Koharu's mother, Ginko (Sayuri Yoshinaga), might join the wedding ceremony, as he is considered to be the black sheep of the family and even Ginko and Koharu consider him to be an embarrassment, even though he has lived with the family for quite some time after the death of Koharu's father.

As the invitations to the wedding had been returned to the sender, everybody is relieved that Tetsuro will not show up, as he has embarrassed the family in the past with his childish behavior and his drunkenness.

But during the party after the ceremony he turns up anyway in a loaned kimono and even after Ginko warns him, he starts drinking heavily and causes a ruckus, which is unsettling the groom's family. During the event he reveals his special relationship to Koharu: Her father asked him to name her, something he is still particularly proud of as every other endeavor in his life failed miserably.

After the event the family is forced to apologize formally to the groom's family and the oldest brother of Ginko and Tetsuro severs all ties with his younger brother. After staying with Ginko for a short time, she lends him money to go back to Osaka where he came from in the first place.

Her uncle's behavior casts a shadow over Koharu's marriage and soon she has got to move in with her mother again. Even Ginko's patience with her brother comes to an end when she is forced to reimburse a lover of his who had entrusted him with her savings which he has gambled away. Now even Ginko severs her ties with Tetsuro and does not want to hear from him anymore: When he visits her next time, Ginko and Koharu throw him out.

Some time passes while Koharu struggles with her ultimate divorce and tries to get her life back together and starts a new relationship with a shy carpenter from the neighborhood.

Finally Ginko- who has secretly filled a missing person report- gets the news that Tetsuro has been hospitalized in Osaka. Despite his misbehavior, she is deeply worried and visits him in Osaka, learning that he is terminally ill with lung cancer and living in a hospice. Despite his illness, Tetsuro has neither lost his sense of humor, nor his childish character and Ginko is moved to see him being merry among the other patients and the staff of the hospice who have learned to enjoy his character.

Tetsuro predicts his own day of death, telling Ginko that the Buddha told him in a dream.

When the day draws closer, Ginko gets the news that Tetsuro's health is deteriorating. She hurries to Osaka and finds him being as cheerful as ever, even tricking her into giving him a drink through his feeding tube. When his death gets closer, Koharu arrives as well and finally forgives her uncle on his deathbed.

Some time later, Koharu makes preparations for her upcoming wedding with the shy carpenter. Around the dinner table Ginko's senile mother-in-law suggests inviting Tetsuro and Koharu and Ginko agree, moved to tears by their memories.

Cast
Sayuri Yoshinaga – Ginko
Tsurube Shofukutei – Tetsuro
Yū Aoi – Koharu
Ryō Kase – Akira
Haruko Kato
Takashi Sasano

Background
Kon Ichikawa had made a film of the same name, Otōto, based on a novel by Aya Koda, in 1960, which won a Special Distinction Award at the Cannes Film Festival the following year.

Film festivals

References

External links
 

Films directed by Yoji Yamada
2010s Japanese-language films
2010 films
Japanese drama films
Films with screenplays by Yôji Yamada